Sanctions against the Islamic Emirate of Afghanistan were implemented by the United Nations in November 1999. The sanctions were aimed at terrorists, Osama Bin Laden and members of Al-Qaeda. 

United States sanctions were tightened against the Taliban under Executive Order 13224 after the September 11 attacks in 2001. After the fall of Kabul in the 2021 Taliban offensive the US froze the Afghan government reserves mostly held in US bank accounts. The authority to freeze these assets came from the existing sanctions against the Taliban. The country's economic future, highly depending on US aid, was called into question under the existing sanctions against the Taliban, complicating the distribution of international humanitarian aid to the beleaguered population.

Context 
On August 7, 1998, the US embassies in Nairobi and Dar es Salaam were bombed and Al-Qaeda had thus triggered the international public's awareness of the organisation. The Security Council's condemned the bombings in general terms but did not address Al-Qaeda specifically. The same year, Resolution 1214 was adopted in which the Council demanded "the Taliban stop providing sanctuary and training for international terrorists and their organizations". On November 5, 1998 Osama bin Laden and his military chief Muhamad Atef were accused in the US District Court of New York for a planned attack on US defense establishments. Following this event, the US delegation to the Security Council legally required to demand the Taliban to hand over Osama bin Laden. Taliban leader Mullah Omar’s refused to hand over Osama bin Laden. In consequence, the Security Council implemented its first measures under the 1267 sanctions regime. In Resolution 1267, the Security Council justified the sanctions regime by referring to violation of humanitarian law in Afghanistan, discrimination against women and the presence of an illicit opiate production.

Goals 
Resolutions adopted by the United Nation's Security Council, 1267 (1999), 1333 (2000), 1363 (2001), 1373 (2001), 1390 (2002), 1452 (2002), 1455 (2003), 1526 (2004), 1566 (2004), 1617 (2005), 1624 (2005), 1699 (2006), 1730 (2006), 1735 (2006), 1822 (2008), 1904 (2009), 1988 (2011), 1989 (2011), 2082 (2012), 2083 (2012), 2133 (2014), 2160 (2014) and 2210 (2015), together expressed the goal to fully disrupt the activities of the Taliban.

UN Sanctions 
The UN sanctions were designed to prevent that Taliban from supporting and conducting acts of international terrorism. The United Nations Security Council Resolution 1267 imposed a series of travel and financial sanctions on members of the Tablian-controlled government of Afghanistan following the bombing of two US embassies by Al-Qaeda in East Africa and for Taliban refusing to surrender Osama bin Laden to stand trail in the US for the embassy bombings. In addition to this, the Security Council "strongly condemned [...] training and planning" of terrorists and terrorists acts and "reiterat[ed]... deep concern" of terrorist activities, as well as violations of international humanitarian law and of human rights, in particular discrimination against women and girls.

Following the US invasion of Afghanistan and the removal of the Taliban from government, the sanctions were amended to target specific individuals. These individuals were placed on a list at the request of member states.

Administration 
Resolution 1267 established a Sanctions Monitoring Committee known as the al-Qaeda and Taliban Sanctions Committee. The committee is composed of the 5 permanent members of the United Nations Security Council. Namely China, France, the Russian Federation, the UK, the US and the ten other Security Council rotating members.

The al-Qaeda and Taliban Sanctions Committee is one of three counterterrorism bodies set up by the Security Council. The committee is further supported by Monitoring Groups established by subsequent resolutions. The Analytical Support and Sanctions Monitoring Team established after Resolution 1526 in 2014 and the Al-Qaeda and the Taliban and associated individuals and entities monitoring team established in Resolution 2253 in 2015.

As the nature of the Taliban changed, the original mandate of Resolution 1267 changed as well. The measures became targeted rather than blanket sanctions. United Nations member states would request the committee to add names to the list. The committee had the mandate to use its "discretionary powers to list [...] targeted individuals and entities". Guidelines to de-list individuals were established in 2006 and The Office of the Ombudsperson, established in 2009, designed to provide an independent and impartial review on requests from individuals, groups, undertaking or entities wishing to be removed from the Sanctions List.

The committee is mandated to:
 oversee the implementation of the sanctions measures
 designate individual and entities who meet the listing criteria set out in the relevant resolutions
 consider requests for exemptions from the sanctions measures
 consider requests to remove a name from the sanctions list
 conduct reviews of the entries on the sanctions list
 examine the reports presented by the Monitoring Team
 report annually to the Security Council 
 conduct outreach activities

Asset Freeze 

The purpose of the United Nation's asset freeze was to deny listed individuals, groups or entities the "means to support or finance terrorism". The asset freeze was to ensure that no funds, financial assets or economic resources were available to al-Qaeda or any individual connected to the organisation.

The onus fell on member states to ensure that they had relevant domestic law criminalising the financing of terrorist organisations, as well as to monitor the activity of national financial institutions to ensure that they were aware of listed individuals and if necessary punish institutions that fail to freeze the assets of individuals. The UN Security Council al-Qaeda and Taliban Sanctions Committee was supported by a Monitoring Team that reported on non-compliance.

Since Resolution 1267, The United Nations Security Council has relied on cooperation with other global organisations such as Interpol and Financial Action Task Force to aid in identifying, monitoring of individuals who are financially linked to terrorist organisations.

Travel Ban 

The Travel Ban was a preventative measure with the purpose to stop individuals, who were on the Consolidated List, from entering or transitting through the territories of United Nations member states. With the overall aim to limit the mobility of listed individuals and decrease likelihood of an attack by the listed individuals taking place.

The onus fell on member states to implement the travel ban against all individuals on the Al-Qaeda Sanctions List, in their national guidelines in accordance with their domestic legislation. The ban applied “in all circumstances [and to] any passage”.

In addition to barring individual travel, all states were obliged to deny permission to any aircraft owned or operated by, or on behalf of the Taliban. Member states were also requested to submit “photographs and other biometric data” on listed individuals so they could be included in Interpol-United Nations Security Council special notices.

Arms Embargo 

Introduced in 2000 by United Nations Security Council Resolution 1333, the UN imposed a mandatory arms embargo on Taliban-controlled Afghanistan. The embargo was designed to pressure the Taliban to close terrorist training camps and to further pressure the group into handing over Osama bin Laden to US authorities. The embargo was originally a blanket ban on the sale and supply of weapons to any person in the territory of Afghanistan.

The arms embargo was designed as a presentation measure and aimed to limit the ability of the Taliban to fight a civil war. The UN placed an additional embargo on the provision of "technical advice, assistance, or training related to military activities" as well as barring the establishment of military or terrorist training facilities. The UN Resolution 1333 also required member states to bar "intermediaries [...] brokers or other third parties" from supplying arms to the Taliban.

The Arms Embargo was supervised by a Committee established in accordance with resolution 1333 and was further supported by a Monitoring Group and Sanctions Enforcement Support Team. These support mechanisms had the power to review the enforcement of sanctions by member states and report to the Security Council on the implementation of the resolution at regular intervals.

The UN modified the embargo in 2002 after the fall of the Taliban regime. Resolution 1390 amended the embargo to target al-Qaeda linked individuals and entities. The resolution established a monitoring committee, which consisted of all six permanent members of the United Nations Security Council, as well as two of the ten rotating members.

Enforcement of Sanctions 
Resolution 1267 was enforced by the Security Council Sanctions Committee or the al-Qaeda and Taliban Sanctions Committee.

The onus on implementing the sanctions fell upon the United Nations member states. Member states were encouraged to introduced domestic legalisation "criminalising the financing of terrorism and associated money laundering", as well as drafting new rules for aviation authorities and adding individuals on the Consolidated List to their national "no fly" list.

Once the aviation and financial sanctions went into effect in November 1999, the sanctions directly led to the "closer of Afghan bank branches" in the neighbouring country of Pakistan, as well as the cancelation of Ariana Afghan Airline's flights.

US financial institutions were bound by Executive Order 133224 to report and freeze assets. As of November 18, 2002, the US had frozen more than $200 million.

Resolution 1333 

The enforcement of Resolution 1333 was primarily the responsibility of the Al-Qaeda and Taliban Sanctions Committee. In addition to this, the Resolution established a Committee of Experts which was authorised to consult with all relevant members states and to report on the implementation of Resolution 1267.

The Committee of Experts was tasked with reviewing the implementation of the embargo as well as building the capacity of neighbouring states to enforce the sanctions. This group was known as the Sanctions Enforcement Team. Resolution 1363 (2001) outlined the assistance given to states bordering Afghanistan. The team would assist in monitoring and verifying information regarding violations, as well as assisting in reporting violations.

After the fall of the Taliban-Controlled government in Afghanistan, the Committee operated with a "two-track" approach. Firstly, the Committee dealt with the Taliban in the area around the Afghan-Pakistan border and their quest for conventional arms and ammunition. Secondly, the Committee dealt with the al-Qaeda cells located around the world and their attempt to acquire weapons of mass destruction.

The onus on implementing the Taliban element of the arms embargo imposed by Resolution 1390 lies primarily with Afghanistan and its six bordering states, i.e. China, Iran, Pakistan, Tajikistan, Turkmenistan and Uzbekistan. Focus was primarily on building capacity to monitor and stem the flow of weapons on the Afghan-Pakistan border.

Resolution 1988 
In 2011 the sanction regime 1267 (enforced in 2001, after the events of 9/11) aimed at the Taliban regime in Afghanistan, was divided into two separate sanction regimes. Sanction regime 1989 targets al-Qaeda specifically, whilst sanction regime 1988 targets the Taliban in Afghanistan. The new resolution included a separate list of Taliban individuals under sanctions. The reason for this modification was that Security Council took into consideration that some of the Taliban had ended their contacts with al-Qaeda, hence the need for separate sanction regimes. The type of sanctions applied for the new regime-1989 remained the same.

Effectiveness 

The two goals of Resolution 1267 was to coerce the Taliban to hand over Osama bin Laden to US authorities to answer to criminal charges over the bombing of two US embassies in East Africa and to prevent the Taliban and al-Qaeda from conducting international acts of terror. The United Nations failed to coerce the Taliban-controlled Afghan government to hand over Osama bin Laden, who was killed in Pakistan in 2011 as a part of the US war effort in Afghanistan. The sanctions also failed to prevent al-Qaeda for conducting terrorist acts. In the years following the implementation of the sanctions, al-Qaeda claimed responsibility for the bombing of USS Cole in 2000 claiming the lives of seventeen American sailors and injured another 39. In addition to USS Cole, al-Qaeda claimed "direct responsibility" for the September 11 attacks, claiming the lives of 2,977 victims in New York City, Washington, DC and outside of Shanksville, Pennsylvania. The success of Resolution 1267 was limited due to the reliance on information provided by member states.

The goal of Resolution 1333 was to restrict the Taliban's access to conventional weapons and ammunition and other weapons of mass destruction. The success of Resolution 1333 was limited because of the reliance on information provided by member states to enable Committees to successfully monitor and enforce sanctions. Resolution 1333 relied on the ability of developing nations without the capability to enforce and report violations. The Committee sent the Sanctions Support Team in 2002. The sanctions support team, which was tasked with implementing the Arms Embargo along the Pakistan-Afghanistan border, was described as a small and "inadequate force" which was placed in the region following the September 11 terrorist attacks. The deployment of monitors was delayed and the arms embargo could not be fully implemented.

Resolution 1267 and subsequent United Nations Security Council Resolution, including 1333, have been credited with the promotion of international cooperation in combatting terrorism and strengthening anti-terrorism measures in intergovernmental organisation such as the Financial Action Task Force (FATF) and the International Monetary Fund (IMF). The mechanisms that were created to minimise the effectiveness of al-Qaeda are still in place and have been utilised by the United Nations to combat the Islamic State.

Non-UN-mandated sanctions against Afghanistan

EU Sanctions 
In accordance with the United Nation's sanction regime 1337, which was adopted after 9/11 2001, the European Union (EU) has as well implemented the sanction regime through various legal acts. A number of individuals and factions have been listed for freezing of assets. However, a full implementation of the 1337-regime by all the EU-member states collectively has not been possible. There is no EU regulation allowing the listing of asset freezing for individuals linked to terrorism originating from, and active within, the EU territory. A majority of the member states have however adopted national regulations which target these individuals.

In 2011, the European Union adopted the following restrictive measures against the Taliban (Council Decision 2011/486/CFSP):

 Embargo on arms and related material
 Ban on provision of certain services
 Freezing of funds and economic resources
 Restrictions on admission

Critique   
Financial Action Task Force (FATF) is an intergovernmental organisation which has established 40 recommendations and functions as a "standard setter" to promote effective measures against money laundering and financing of terrorism, among other things. FATF evaluates its member states to guarantee the established recommendations are being followed. Regarding the implementation of resolution 1267 and the 1988/1989 sanction regimes, FATF has criticized the EU for too slow action regarding enforcement of the UN-listings of asset freezing. According to FATF's recommendations the member countries should implement economic sanctions settled by the UN, without impediment. Sweden is one of the countries that have been criticized, among other countries that lack national systems for these regulations.

One reason for the impediment from the decision on sanctions by the UN until it is implemented by the EU, is the need for translation. From the moment the list on sanctions is published in New York until the EU-decision is published in Brussels it take some days as the text in the resolution must be translated into the official EU-languages. This delay causes some issues as during the process of translation the listed individuals can freely withdraw money from banks within the EU.

US sanctions 

President Clinton froze the Islamic Emirate of Taliban's assets under Executive Order No. 13129 on July 4, 1999. This was based on US findings that the Taliban had allowed Usama bin Laden and Al Qaeda to use Afghanistan as a base of operations from which acts of violence were planned and committed against the United States. The executive order was issued under the authority of the International Emergency Economic Powers Act (IEEPA), the National Emergencies Act and other relevant US laws.

Effects on the Afghan people 
Widespread protests broke out in Afghanistan in November 1999, as the UN sanctions went into effect. Protesters attacked UN offices and vehicles. The Afghan national airline Ariana that transported medicine, food and health care providers to Afghanistan was grounded. Several NGOs withdrew their programmes as the level of insecurity in Afghanistan rose and due to the withdrawal of donors' support. At the time, NGOs represented approximately 70% of the provided health care services in Afghanistan. The sanctions aggravated the humanitarian crisis in the country, which had suffered from a war for more than twenty years.

In August 2000 the UN Office for the Coordination of Humanitarian Affairs (OCHA) reported that the existing sanctions had a “tangible negative effect” on Afghanistan's populace. Aid groups like MSF and Human Rights Watch together with the UN Secretary-General Kofi Annan and UN Afghanistan, criticized the decision for stricter sanctions against Afghanistan's ruling party in 2000, with regard to the humanitarian situation in the country.

The medical journal The Lancet reported in 2001 that the implementation of tougher UN sanctions on Afghanistan coincided with a period of drought in the country. According to a spokesperson for Médecins Sans Frontières (MSF) food had become so scarce many people resorted to eating plant roots. A spokesperson for the United Nations High Commissioner for Refugees (UNHCR) called the situation “a famine-like crisis”.

Lifting of Sanctions 
On January 15, 2002 the Security Council lifted its sanctions against Ariana Afghan Airlines. This was due to the new reality that the Afghan Airlines was no longer owned by or operated by the Taliban. Sanctions against the Central Afghani Bank were also lifted.

In the Security Council's Resolution 2255 (2015) the Council recognized that

”the security situation in Afghanistan has evolved and that some members of the Taliban have reconciled with the Government of Afghanistan, have rejected the terrorist ideology of Al-Qaeda and its followers, and support a peaceful resolution to the continuing conflict in Afghanistan”

And further it was stated that the Security Council,

”Taking note of the Government of Afghanistan's request that the Security Council support reconciliation, including by removing names from the United Nations sanctions lists for those who reconcile and have ceased to engage in or support activities that threaten the peace, stability and security of Afghanistan,

Expressing its intention to give due regard to lifting sanctions on those who reconcile”.

Controversies

Disregard for Human Rights 

As the sanctions were modified to target individuals, concerns about the "interference with the fundamental rights" of the listed individuals were raised. The freezing of assets denied access to private individual funds that provide for basic expenses. The nature of the sanctions lacked a definite end-date. Without an end-date the sanctions could be regarded as "punitive" rather than "preventative" without the legal protections that are provided under international criminal laws.

Individuals were placed on the consolidated list at the suggestion of United Nations member states. These suggestions were accepted on the basis of "political trust," rather than "credible information" regarding personal connections to the Taliban, bin Laden or al-Qaeda. Another controversy was that an individual could be placed on the list on the suggestion of a single state, whilst a consensus of all committee members was needed for the individual to be removed.

Right to Due Process 
One of the major controversies following Resolution 1267 and subsequent resolutions was the United Nations Security Council disregard for international recognised standards of due process. The committee lacked guidelines and procedures for placing individuals on the consolidated list, which blacklisted them for access to personal monetary funds. There was also no mechanisms for individuals to be informed of their listing, to know the allegations against them, or challenge their listing.

After much criticism against the UN sanctions procedures, member states made efforts to improve procedures and increase transparency. For instance, improvements of the listing and delisting process followed. With resolution 1730 (2006) the Focal Point for Delisting was added, where listed individuals are able to contact the governments that had listed them, and request to be “delisted”. Previously there was no such mechanism available.

References

Afghanistan Sanctions
Taliban
Economy of Afghanistan
Politics of Afghanistan
1999 in Afghanistan